Gomiashvili (Georgian: გომიაშვილი) is a Georgian surname that may refer to
Archil Gomiashvili (1926–2005), Soviet theatre and film actor
Giorgi Gomiashvili (1972–2012), Georgian business executive and diplomat, grandson of Archil

Georgian-language surnames